Rhode Island elected its members August 27, 1816.

See also 
 1816 and 1817 United States House of Representatives elections
 List of United States representatives from Rhode Island

1816
Rhode Island
United States House of Representatives